Slichter Foreland is a high ice-covered peninsula, 15 nautical miles (28 km) long and 10 nautical miles (18 km) wide, forming the northeast arm of Martin Peninsula on the coast of Marie Byrd Land. First mapped from aerial photographs taken by U.S. Navy Operation Highjump in January 1947. Named by Advisory Committee on Antarctic Names (US-ACAN) after Louis B. Slichter, Professor Emeritus of Physics, University of California, Los Angeles, who has been involved with planning scientific programs for the South Pole Station, and who has trained a number of geophysicists who have gone to Antarctica to implement those programs.

Peninsulas of Marie Byrd Land